Dwarven or Dwarvish language may refer to:

 Khuzdûl, the tongue of the Dwarves in J. R. R. Tolkien's Middle-earth
 Kad'k, the language of the dwarfs in Terry Pratchett's Discworld novels